This is a list of the largest trading partners of Bangladesh based on data from The Observatory of Economic Complexity (OEC).

See also 

 Economy of Bangladesh
 List of the largest trading partners of the United States
 List of the largest trading partners of China
 List of the largest trading partners of Russia
 List of the largest trading partners of Germany
 List of the largest trading partners of the European Union

References 

Business in Bangladesh
Economy of Bangladesh-related lists
Trading partners of Bangladesh